Softlanding Linux System (SLS) was one of the first Linux distributions. The first release was by Peter MacDonald in August 1992.  Their slogan at the time was "Gentle Touchdowns for DOS Bailouts".

SLS was the first release to offer a comprehensive Linux distribution containing more than the Linux kernel, GNU, and other basic utilities, including an implementation of the X Window System.

History
SLS was the most popular Linux distribution at the time, but it was considered to be rather buggy by its users. It was soon superseded by Slackware (which started as a cleanup of SLS by Patrick Volkerding) and Yggdrasil Linux/GNU/X, among others.

Similarly, Ian Murdock's frustration with SLS led him to create the Debian project.

References

External links
SLS at Princeton University
SLS version 1.02 at GitHub
SLS version 1.03 at ibiblio

Discontinued Linux distributions
1992 software
Linux distributions